Marryat or Marryatt is a surname. It may refer to:

Marryat
Augusta Marryat (c. 1828–1899), British children's writer and illustrator
Charles Marryat (1827–1906), Dean of Adelaide from 1887 to 1906
Emilia Marryat (1835–1875), English author children's books
Frank Marryat (1826–1855), sailor, artist, and author
Frederick Marryat (1792–1848), English Royal Navy officer, a novelist, and an acquaintance of Charles Dickens
Florence Marryat (1833–1899), British author and actress
George Selwyn Marryat (1840–1896), British country gentleman and angler
Horace Marryat (1818–1887), English traveller and author
Joseph Marryat (1757–1824), English businessman and British member of Parliament for Horsham
Thomas Marryat (1730–1792), English physician, medical writer and wit
Zephaniah Marryat (1684–1754), English nonconformist minister

Marryatt
Arthur A. Marryatt (1873–1949), New Zealand sports administrator
Carlos Marryatt (born 1968), New Zealand cyclist
Tony Marryatt (born 1954), New Zealand civil servant

See also
J. T. Marryat Hornsby (1857–1921), New Zealand politician

References